The 2011 NCAA Division I men's soccer tournament was a single-elimination tournament involving 48 teams to determine the champion of the 2011 NCAA Division I men's soccer season. The 53rd edition of the tournament began on November 17, 2011 and culminated with the North Carolina Tar Heels defeating the Charlotte 49ers, 1–0, in the final on December 13 at Regions Park in Hoover, Alabama.

While the tournament resulted in few upsets, most national soccer headlines were made behind Charlotte's run to the final. The 49ers entered the tournament through an at-large bid, and were not seeded. Despite that, they were able to defeat defending champions, the Akron Zips, 1–0, in the third round, and then the Connecticut Huskies, 4–2, in a penalty shootout to advance to the College Cup. Joining the Tar Heels and the 49ers in the College Cup were the UCLA Bruins and the Creighton Bluejays.

With the victory in the national final, the Tar Heels won their second NCAA Division I Men's Soccer Championship in program history.

Qualified Teams

A total of 48 teams will qualify into the tournament proper, either automatically, or through an at-large bid that is determined by a selection committee. Each conference that field varsity soccer teams are admitted one automatic berth into the tournament. Depending on the conference, that automatic berth is either given the champions of the regular season, or the tournament that culminates the regular season. Twenty-two teams earn automatic bids into the tournament, while 26 enter through an at-large bid.

Automatic bids

At-Large Bids

Format 

Like previous editions of the NCAA Division I Tournament, the tournament featured 64 participants out of a possible field of 198 teams. Of the 64 berths, 22 were allocated to the conference tournament or regular season winners. The remaining 42 berths were determined through an at-large process based upon teams' Ratings Percentage Index that did not win their conference tournament. The most at-large berths went to schools from the Big East and Atlantic Coast conferences, containing half of the tournament field's at-large berths (six and five berths, respectively). Of the remaining 11 berths, six were from the Colonial Athletic and Conference USA conferences, each earning three berths.

From there, the NCAA Selection Committee selected the top sixteen seeds for the tournament, that earned an automatic bye to the second round of the tournament. The remaining 48 teams played in a single-elimination match in the first round of the tournament, to play a seeded team in the second round.

Similar to the Lamar Hunt U.S. Open Cup, each of the tournament rounds were single-elimination. However, matches tied at the end of regulation went to two 10-minute golden goal periods, followed by a penalty shoot-out, if necessary. All matches in the first, second and third rounds, as well as the quarterfinals, were hosted by the higher seed. The College Cup, also known as the semifinals and final for the tournament were held at a neutral venue, this time being at Regions Park in Hoover, Alabama (south of Birmingham.

Seeded teams

Schedule

Bracket

Regional 1

Regional 2

Regional 3

Regional 4

College Cup – Regions Park, Hoover, Alabama

Schedule 

Host team, or higher seed, is listed on the right. Away team or lower seed is listed on the left.

First round

Second round 

Numbers represent the seed the team earned in the tournament.

Third round

Quarterfinals

College Cup: Semifinals

College Cup: Final

Statistics

Top goalscorers 
4 goals

  Casey Townsend – Maryland

3 goals

  Darren Mattocks – Akron
  Giuseppe Gentile – Charlotte
  Mamadou Diouf – Connecticut
  Ethan Finlay – Creighton
  Ben Speas – North Carolina
  Chandler Hoffman – UCLA

2 goals

  Dylan Remick – Brown
  Sean Rosa – Brown
  T. J. Beaulieu – Charlotte
  Jennings Rex – Charlotte
  Ashton Bennett – Coastal Carolina
  Teejay East – Coastal Carolina
  Tony Cascio – Connecticut
  Chris Thomas – Elon
  Nikita Kotlov – Indiana
  Nick DeLeon – Louisville
  Colin Rolfe – Louisville
  Billy Schuler – North Carolina
  Tom Mohoric – Saint Mary's
  Trevor Newquist – Saint Mary's

1 goal

  Scott Caldwell – Akron
  Luke Holmes – Akron
  Aodhan Quinn – Akron
  Patrick Chin – Boston College
  Keegan Balle – Bradley
  Scott Davis – Bradley
  Bryan Gaul – Bradley
  Jochen Graf – Bradley
  Aidan Leonard – Brown
  T. J. Popolizio – Brown
  Evan James – Charlotte
  Ricky Garbanzo – Coastal Carolina
  Cyprian Hedrick – Coastal Carolina
  Steven Miller – Colgate
  Matt Schuber – Colgate
  Carlos Alvarez – Connecticut
  Bruno Castro – Creighton
  Jose Gomez – Creighton
  Andrew Ribeiro – Creighton
  John Dineen – Delaware
  Nick Palodichuk – Duke
  Chris Tweed-Kent – Duke
  James Carroll – Elon
  Daniel Shaw – Fairfield
  Jake Zuniga – Fairfield
  Martin Ontiveros – Furman
  Tim Wylie – Indiana
  Christian McLaughlin – James Madison
  Jimmy Simpson – James Madison
  Daniel Keller – Louisville
  Michael Roman – Louisville
  Kenney Walker – Louisville
  Andrew Raymonds – Loyola-Chicago
  Jordan Cyrus – Maryland
  Matt Oduaran – Maryland
  Matt Jeffery – Monmouth
  Carson Baldinger – New Mexico
  Blake Smith – New Mexico
  Matt Hedges – North Carolina
  Rob Lovejoy – North Carolina
  Enzo Martínez – North Carolina
  Kirk Urso – North Carolina
  Isaac Kannah – Northern Illinois
  Mike Mascitti – Northern Illinois
  Sean Totsch – Northern Illinois
  Peter O'Neill – Northwestern
  Brandon Adler – Providence
  Anthony Baumann – Providence
  John Raley – Providence
  Nate Bourdeau – Rutgers
  Juan Pablo Correa – Rutgers
  Ibrahim Kamara – Rutgers
  Bryant Knibbs – Rutgers
  Riley Hanley – Saint Mary's
  Justin Howard – Saint Mary's
  Tyler Engel – SMU
  Arthur Ivo – SMU
  Chipper Root – South Carolina
  Wesley Charpie – South Florida
  Chase Wickham – UAB
  Miguel Ibarra – UC Irvine
  Josue Madueno – UC Santa Barbara
  David Opoku – UC Santa Barbara
  Dom Sarle – UC Santa Barbara
  Luis Silva – UC Santa Barbara
  Kevan George – UCF
  Ben Hunt – UCF
  Víctor Chavez – UCLA
  Ryan Hollingshead – UCLA
  Kelyn Rowe – UCLA
  Reed Williams – UCLA
  Ross Tomaselli – Wake Forest
  Eric Schoenle – West Virginia
  Jay Williams – West Virginia
  Gino Depaoli – Xavier

Own goals

 Colgate (playing against Rutgers)
 UCF (playing against South Florida)

See also
NCAA Men's Soccer Championship
2011 NCAA Division I men's soccer season

References 

Tournament
NCAA Division I Men's Soccer Tournament seasons
NCAA
NCAA Division I men's soccer tournament
NCAA Division I men's soccer tournament
NCAA Division I men's soccer tournament